Otto VII of Tecklenburg (died 1450) was Count of Tecklenburg from 1426 until his death.

Life 
Otto VII was the only son of Count Nicholas II of Tecklenburg and his wife Anna Elisabeth, a daughter of Count Frederick III of Moers.  In 1426, he succeeded his father as Count of Tecklenburg.  Like his father, he fought many feuds, in an attempt to win back some of the territories his father had lost. The attempt failed, and pushed his county deeper into debt.  This accelerated the decline of the county.

He died in 1450, and was succeeded by his eldest son, Nicholas III.

Marriage and issue 
Around 1428, he married Ermengarda of Hoya-Nienburg, the daughter of Count Eric I of Hoya.  They had two children:
 Nicholas III (d. 1508)
 Adelaide (d. 1477), married in 1453 with Gerhard VI, Count of Oldenburg (d. 1500)

After Ermengarde's death, Otto VII married Aleidis, the daughter of Gottschak VIII of Plesse and had three more children:
 Otto VIII (d. 1493)
 Maria (d. 1493), abbess of St. Boniface abbey in Freckenhorst
 Anna (d. 1508),  abbess of Gerresheim Abbey

Counts of Tecklenburg
Lords of Rheda
Year of birth unknown
1450 deaths
15th-century German people